Karyatis may refer to -
 Caryatis, an Ancient Greek goddess
 , a Greek cargo ship in service 1964-68
 Caryatis, see Caryatid